The College of Education is one of the ten academic colleges of Florida Atlantic University located in Boca Raton, Florida. The college is accredited by the National Council for Accreditation of Teacher Education and actively holds teaching partnerships with A.D. Henderson School and Florida Atlantic University High School.

Overview 
The college was founded in 1964 when Florida Atlantic opened its doors. As of 2007, enrollment in the College of Education totaled 3,253 or 13% of Florida Atlantic University's total student body. Elementary Education is the top undergraduate major at the university based on total headcount enrollments.

Alexander D. Henderson University School 
The Alexander D. Henderson University School is a public elementary and middle school (K-8) and legislated school district operating as an educational laboratory on the FAU's Boca Raton campus. The school is rated an "A+ School" by the Florida Department of Education. This ranking is determined based on student scores on the Florida Comprehensive Assessment Test. The Henderson School is also a U.S. Department of Education Blue Ribbon School.

FAU Pine Jog Environmental Education Center 
The college also operates the Pine Jog Environmental Education Center. Pine Jog serves over 25,000 students, 750 teachers, and 12,500 families annually from Palm Beach County and surrounding counties.

References

External links 
 Florida Atlantic University College of Education
 Florida Atlantic University Official Website
 FAU Pine Jog Environmental Education Center

Florida Atlantic University
Universities and colleges in Palm Beach County, Florida
Educational institutions established in 1964
1964 establishments in Florida